Ruhwa may refer to any of the following:
 Ruhwa, Burundi, a border town at the border with Rwanda
 Ruhwa, Rwanda, a border town at the border with Burundi
 Ruhwa River, a tributary of the Ruzizi River; it forms part of the border between Rwanda and Burundi